Jane Josephine Meirowsky, (b. 1941) known professionally as Jane Merrow, is a British actress who has been active from the 1960s in both Britain and the United States.

Early years
Merrow was born in 1941 in Hertfordshire to an English mother and German-Jewish refugee father. "My father’s side of the family were ethnically Jewish, but not practising," she would later state. She is a graduate of the Royal Academy of Dramatic Art. She also was active in the British National Youth Theatre and won the Shakespeare Cup at the Kent Drama Festival.

Film and television career
In 1963, Merrow was cast in the lead role of a BBC adaptation of Lorna Doone and subsequently had roles in British TV series such as Danger Man, The Saint, The Baron, The Prisoner (in the 1967 episode "The Schizoid Man" as Alison, a mind reader), Gerry Anderson's UFO, and The Avengers where, having appeared in the penultimate episode of the 1967 series, she was considered as the replacement for a departing Diana Rigg. The role went to Linda Thorson instead. 

She also appeared as Lollo Romano in the 1965 "Gang War" episode of Gideon's Way. She featured in a new version of the Nigel Kneale adaptation of Nineteen Eighty-Four (1965) which was broadcast in the Theatre 625 series. David Buck was Winston Smith with Merrow as his lover, Julia.

Merrow starred in the British science fiction film Night of the Big Heat (1967) with Peter Cushing and Christopher Lee, prior to her most prominent role as Alais, the mistress of Henry II (played by Peter O'Toole) in The Lion in Winter (1968), for which she received a 1969 Golden Globe nomination in the category of actress in a supporting role, losing to Ruth Gordon who won for Rosemary's Baby. She appeared in Adam's Woman with Beau Bridges in 1970.  She also appeared as the blind Laura in the Hammer film Hands of the Ripper (1971). She appeared in an episode ("Who Killed Cock Robin?", 1969) of Randall and Hopkirk (Deceased). In 1971, she played Anne Hepton in Hadleigh, becoming the romantic interest of the lead character. 

Around this time, she moved to the U.S., where she guest-starred on television in dramas, mysteries and adventure programmes, including Mission: Impossible, Bearcats!, Mannix, Emergency!, Police Woman, The Six Million Dollar Man, Cannon, Barnaby Jones, The Eddie Capra Mysteries, Airwolf, MacGyver, Hart to Hart, Magnum, P.I., The Incredible Hulk, Once an Eagle, The Greatest American Hero, and The Magician.

Later life
In the 1990s, Merrow returned to Britain to run a family business. In 2006, she took part in a Prisoner-related event in Portmeirion, North Wales, and in 2008, she was a guest there for the annual convention for The Prisoner TV series organised by the Prisoner Appreciation Society.

The summer of 2009 saw Merrow return to the stage, playing Emilia in Shakespeare's play The Comedy of Errors with the Idaho Shakespeare Company.

Filmography

Notes

External links

Jane Merrow website

Alumni of RADA
English film actresses
English television actresses
Living people
English people of German descent
Actresses from Hertfordshire
Year of birth missing (living people)